I Smile Back is a 2015 American drama film directed by Adam Salky and based on the 2008 novel of the same name by Amy Koppelman, who wrote the screenplay with Paige Dylan. The film stars Sarah Silverman as an upper-middle-class wife and mother struggling with mental illness and addiction. The film had its world premiere at the 2015 Sundance Film Festival on January 25, 2015.  It also screened at the Toronto International Film Festival on September 16, 2015.  The film was released in a limited release on October 23, 2015, by Broad Green Pictures.

Plot
In a nice home in suburban New York, homemaker Laney Brooks snorts a white powdered drug in the bathroom while her husband Bruce plays outside with their young children, Eli and Janey.  Laney remembers  arguing with Bruce about their new dog. Later, Eli wakes from a nightmare and Laney comforts him.

As Bruce gets ready for work in the morning, Laney eyes the bathroom medicine cabinet, then prepares the children's lunches. She drives them to school and has a confrontation with the traffic guard.  She greets her friend Susan and is stopped by another guard for not having her ID. She reluctantly waves goodbye to her children and drives away, resentfully mocking the school guard. 

At a hotel, she has sex with Susan's husband Donny, then chides him afterward, telling him love means nothing.  She showers as he sleeps and takes cash from his wallet as she leaves. She misses the exit driving back to school. At dinner, Laney drinks vodka from a wine glass and responds angrily when Eli relates a school friend's opinions. At bedtime she reminds Eli of his upcoming piano recital, then argues again with Bruce about their dog, dreading its eventual death. She phones Eli's friend's mother, curses at her and hangs up. She drinks more vodka, downs pills and snorts powder, then wanders into a sleeping Janey's bedroom. Lying on the rug, she clutches Janey's teddy bear, writhing and sobbing. She crawls down the hall and collapses.

Bruce finds her and drives her to a rehabilitation facility, where she argues with the staff and dry heaves in the toilet. Later, Dr. Page tells her about all the drugs detected in her system. Missing is any trace of her lithium prescription. She tells him of her abandonment by her father, Roger. Laney's family visits her for lunch. She notices Eli has developed a tic, and she tries to confess and apologize to Bruce, but he rebuffs her. Later, she tells Dr. Page she wants to smile again. He tells her to take her medication and have faith in herself.

Home from rehab, Laney makes a cake with her family. The power goes out and they sing and dance by candlelight. Later, Laney and Bruce meet with a counselor regarding Eli's anxiety. Eli worries he too will have to go to rehab. Laney and Bruce later go to Donny's restaurant for a birthday dinner for Susan, who is now pregnant, where Laney insults another couple. 

Later, Laney accompanies Bruce to a seminar in a hotel near Roger's home. While Bruce attends the conference, she takes a cab to Roger's house, meeting his young daughter Daisy for the first time. She learns of her grandmother's untimely death. Roger offers excuses for abandoning his family. Laney cries in the taxi back, calls Bruce and gets no answer.  

Walking into a bar, she flirts with the bartender and tells him to "keep 'em coming." At the hotel, Bruce packs. Laney enters, apologizing for missing dinner. Tired of her lies, he pushes her against the wall and shouts at her. Leaving, he tells her that the children will continue staying with his sister as he doesn't trust her and that he will meet them all at Eli's recital.

Bruce arrives at the recital as Eli begins playing the piano, hesitantly at first but more confidently as he continues. All applaud when he finishes. Back at home, Laney praises Eli, then retreats to the bathroom to snort from her hidden drug stash. Bruce, Eli and Janey find her there, bleeding from her nose. Laney leaves in an SUV. Reason gone, she closes her eyes, takes her hands off the wheel and drives through a red light unscathed. She drives to Donny's restaurant, asking him for something to calm her down, but he refuses. Susan calls and he leaves. Laney then takes pills from his desk and downs them. She leaves and visits a bar. Ordering a beer, she flirts with a man and they have sex in the basement. When she drunkenly taunts him, he slams her face twice into a stone wall and empties her wallet, leaving her unconscious. Later, she awakens caked in blood and takes a cab home. 

In the predawn glow, she prepares lunches, still battered and bloody. She hugs the whimpering dog and notices Bruce staring at her from the upstairs landing. Her face cracking, she shuffles out of the house and shuts the door.

Cast
Sarah Silverman as Elaine "Laney" Brooks
Josh Charles as Bruce Brooks
Thomas Sadoski as Donny
Mia Barron as Susan
Skylar Gaertner as Eli Brooks
Shayne Coleman as Janey Brooks
Sean Reda as Henry
Chris Sarandon as Roger
Billy Magnussen as Zach
Kristin Griffith as Nurse Pauline
Oona Laurence as Daisy
Clark Jackson as Mr. Odesky
Terry Kinney as Dr. Page

Release
The film had its world premiere at the Sundance Film Festival on January 25, 2015. Shortly after, Broad Green Pictures acquired distribution rights to the film. The film was selected to screen at the Jerusalem Film Festival on July 11, 2015. and the Deauville Film Festival on September 6, 2015, as well as the Toronto International Film Festival on September 16, 2015, the Oldenburg International Film Festival on September 19, 2015, and the Chicago International Film Festival on October 16, 2015. The film was released on October 23, 2015, in a limited release.

Home media
I Smile Back was released on DVD and Blu-ray in the United States on February 23, 2016.

Reception

Critical reception
I Smile Back received mixed reviews from critics, with universal praise for Silverman's performance. On Rotten Tomatoes, the film has a 49% approval rating, based on 71 reviews, with an average rating of 5.76/10. The website's critical consensus reads, "I Smile Back serves as a powerful showcase for Sarah Silverman's dramatic range, but fails to surround her committed performance with a movie worthy of its depth". On Metacritic, the film has a score of 59 out of 100, based on 19 critics, indicating "mixed or average reviews". IndieWire reviewer Katie Walsh gave strong praise to Silverman's performance in the film.

Accolades
Silverman was nominated for Screen Actors Guild Award for Outstanding Performance by a Female Actor in a Leading Role at the 22nd Screen Actors Guild Awards.

References

External links
 
 
 
 

2015 films
2015 drama films
2015 independent films
Adultery in films
American drama films
American independent films
Broad Green Pictures films
Films about addiction
Films about depression
Films about drugs
Films based on American novels
Films set in New Jersey
Films shot in New York (state)
2010s English-language films
Films directed by Adam Salky
2010s American films